Allied Command Transformation (ACT) (French: Commandement allié Transformation) is a military command of the North Atlantic Treaty Organization (NATO), formed in 2003 after restructuring.

It was intended to lead military transformation of alliance forces and capabilities, using new concepts such as the NATO Response Force and new doctrines in order to improve the alliance's military effectiveness. Since France rejoined the NATO Military Command Structure in mid-2009, a significant change took place where the Supreme Allied Commander Transformation (SACT) became a French officer. The first French officer to serve as SACT was French Air Force General Stephane Abrial (2009–2012).

History

Allied Command Atlantic 1952 to 2003
Allied Command Transformation was preceded by Allied Command Atlantic (ACLANT) established in 1952 under the overall command of Supreme Allied Commander Atlantic (SACLANT), with its headquarters at Norfolk, Virginia. ACLANT's purpose was to guard the sea lines of communication between North America and Europe in order to reinforce the European countries of NATO with U.S. troops and supplies in the event of a Soviet/Warsaw Pact invasion of Western Europe. Following the end of the Cold War, the Command was reduced, with many of its subordinate headquarters spread across the Atlantic area losing their NATO status and funding.  However, the basic structure remained in place until the Prague Summit in the Czech Republic in 2002.  This led to ACLANT being decommissioned effective 19 June 2003, and a new Allied Command Transformation being established as its successor.

Admiral Edmund P. Giambastiani Jr. US Navy became the last SACLANT on 2 October 2002. He served as ACLANT commander until 19 Jun 2003. He then served as Supreme Allied Commander, Transformation, until 1 Aug 2005. Admiral Sir Mark Stanhope RN, the Deputy Supreme Allied Commander, then served as Acting Supreme Allied Commander until the arrival of General Lance L. Smith USAF in November 2005.

After the Cold War
At the 2002 Prague Summit, it was decided that NATO should change its military structures and concepts, and acquire new types of equipment to face the operational challenges of coalition warfare against the threats of the new millennium.  Thus NATO's military command structure was reorganized. One strategic command, Allied Command Transformation (ACT), was focused on transforming NATO, while the other strategic command focused on NATO's operations, Allied Command Operations (ACO/SHAPE). Initial reports about a NATO transformation command began to appear in July 2002.  ACT was formally established on June 19, 2003.

A suite of "Baseline for Rapid Iterative Transformational Experimentation" (BRITE) software was designed in response to the Maritime Situational Awareness request. This request, a product of a U.S. international and inter-agency initiatives termed "Maritime Domain Awareness," serves to counter threats to the maritime commons including terrorism, human/drug smuggling, piracy, and espionage.

Since Allied Command Atlantic became Allied Command Transformation, commanders have included non-naval officers. Gen. Lance L. Smith USAF commanded ACT from 10 Nov 2005 until 9 Nov 2007. He was succeeded by Gen. James N. Mattis USMC, who served from 9 Nov 2007 - 08 Sep 2009. A significant change was the assumption of command by a French officer, after France rejoined the NATO Command Structure in mid-2009. General Stéphane Abrial, former chief of the French Air Force assumed command in 2009. French Air Force General Jean-Paul Paloméros replaced Abrial at the end of September 2012. On 30 September 2015 French Air Force General Denis Mercier succeeded General Paloméros, in September 2018 General André Lanata succeeded General Mercier, and in 2021 General Philippe Lavigne succeeded General Lanata.

The Deputy Supreme Allied Commander Transformation position is  filled by General Chris Badia of the German Air Force. He succeeded General Paolo Ruggiero, Italian Army, who succeeded Admiral Manfred Nielson, German Navy, who succeeded General Mirco Zuliani of the Italian Air Force, General Mieczysław Bieniek of the Polish Land Forces, Admiral Luciano Zappata (Italian Navy) and Admiral Stanhope. For several years, in a carryover from SACLANT, the Deputy's position was filled by a Royal Navy admiral. Stanhope's succession by Zappata meant an end to this practice.

Responsibilities
Allied Command Transformation's current mission is to:
provide the conceptual framework for the conduct of future combined joint operations;
define how future operations will be conducted and what capabilities they will need;
take new operational concepts, from others or self-generated, assess their viability and value, and bring them to maturity through doctrine development, scientific research, experimentation and technological development;
implement both by persuading nations, individually and collectively, to acquire the capability, and provide the education and training, enabling concepts to be implemented by NATO forces.

A large number of conferences and seminars have been organised by the command in fulfilment of its conceptual development mission. These have included CD&E, a national Chiefs of Transformation conference, an examination of the Global Commons, Law of Armed Conflict, and a Multiple Futures project.

Organization

The command's headquarters is in Norfolk, Virginia, in the United States. HQ SACT itself is organised into a command group, the Transformation Directorate, the Transformation Support Directorate, National Liaison Representatives, the Partnership for Peace Staff Element and Reservists responsible to HQ SACT.

The Transformation Directorate is headed by the Deputy Chief of Staff (DCOS) Transformation who acts as the Supreme Allied Commander, Transformation's (SACT) Director for guidance and coordination of the activities of his or hers Directorate Transformation, divided in two divisions: Implementation and Capabilities. Within the full scale of SACT's transformational responsibilities the Deputy Chief of Staff (DCOS) Transformation assists the Chief of Staff (COS) in the execution of his or her duties with emphasis on deliverables to the Alliance Military Transformation Process in order to enhance NATO's operational capabilities and to meet NATO's future requirements.

The Implementation Division, led by Assistant Chief of Staff (ACOS) Implementation, is responsible for guidance and coordination of the activities of two Sub-Divisions, Joint Education and Training (JET) and Joint Experimentation, Exercises and Assessment (JEEA), as well as providing guidance for the Joint Warfare Centre (JWC) and Joint Analysis Lessons Learned Centre (JALLC), in their efforts to enhance training programs, to path on what does this mean? breaking concept development and experimentation, to develop effective programs to capture and implement lessons learned and to press on common standards. This division probablyis there some doubt? serves as NATO's linkpoint to the annual U.S.-led Coalition Warrior Interoperability Demonstration.

The Capabilities Division, led by Assistant Chief of Staff (ACOS) Capabilities, is responsible for guidance and coordination of the activities of three Sub-Divisions: of Strategic Concepts, Policy and Interoperability (SCPI); Future Capabilities, Research and Technology (FCRT) and Defence Planning (Def Plan) in their efforts to staff Capabilities, Concepts and Development products.

Subordinate commands
Reflecting NATO as a whole, ACT has a presence on both sides of the Atlantic. Before the deactivation of United States Joint Forces Command, the two organisations were co-located, and indeed shared a commander for some time. There is an ACT command element located at SHAPE in Mons, Belgium. ACT's major subordinate commands are the Joint Warfare Centre (JWC) in Stavanger, Norway; the Joint Force Training Centre (JFTC) in Bydgoszcz, Poland; and the Joint Analysis and Lessons Learned Centre (JALLC) in Monsanto, Portugal. Under a customer-funded arrangement, ACT invests about 30 million Euros into research with the NATO Communications and Information Agency (NCIA) each year to support scientific and experimental programs.

NATO Centres of Excellence
A Centre of Excellence (COE) offers recognised expertise and experience to the benefit of the Alliance, especially in support of transformation. Most are single-nation sponsored, but some are sponsored by multiple members. NATO had a total of 28 accredited COEs. It provides opportunities to enhance education and training, to improve interoperability and capabilities, to assist in doctrine development and/or to test and validate concepts through experimentation. A COE is not a part of the NATO Military Command Structure, but their activities with NATO are coordinated through HQ ACT. Since COEs are predominantly multinational entities, most COEs are overseen by a steering committee (SC), that sets the programme of work and approves the budget for the COE. The SC consists of one voting representative of each Sponsoring Nation (SN) and a various number of observers. All decisions are made by consensus.

Principles:
No duplication or competition with existing NATO capabilities
Nationally funded
Conforms to NATO procedures, doctrines, standards and security policies
Coordinated Programmes of Work provide guidance with inputs from both ACT and ACO organisations

NATO has the following fully accredited COEs:
The Center for Analysis & Simulation for the Preparation of Air Operations Centre of Excellence  (CASPOA) COE in Lyon – Mont Verdun Air Base, France
The Civil-Military Cooperation Centre of Excellence (CIMIC) COE in The Hague, Netherlands
The Centre of Excellence Cold Weather Operations COE CWO in Elverum, Norway
Combined Joint Operations from the Sea Center of Excellence (CJOS-COE) in Norfolk, Virginia, United States.() The CJOS COE used to be a component of the United States Second Fleet.
The Command & Control Centre of Excellence  (C2) COE in Utrecht, Netherlands
The Cooperative Cyber Defence Centre of Excellence in Tallinn, Estonia
The Counter Improvised Explosive Devices Centre of Excellence (C-IED) COE in Madrid, Spain
The Defence Against Terrorism Centre of Excellence (DAT) COE in Ankara, Turkey
Energy Security (ENSEC) COE in Vilnius, Lithuania
The Explosive Ordnance Disposal (EOD) COE in Trenčín, Slovakia
The Human Intelligence Centre of Excellence (HUMINT) COE in Oradea, Romania
The Joint Air Power Competence Center (JAPCC) COE in Kalkar, Germany. JAPCC is located at Von-Seydlitz-Kaserne, Römerstraße 140. D-47546 Kalkar. The JAPCC succeeds the Reaction Forces (Air) Staff, originally activated in 1993. The RFAS Memorandum of Understanding was terminated and all RFAS activities ceased on the formal activation of the Joint Air Power Competence Centre on 1 January 2005.
The Joint Chemical, Biological, Radiation, & Nuclear Defence Centre of Excellence (JCBRN Defence) COE in Vyškov, Czech Republic
The Military Engineering Centre of Excellence in Ingolstadt, Germany
The Military Medical Centre of Excellence (MILMED) COE in Budapest, Hungary
The Modelling and Simulation (M&S) COE in Rome, Italy
The Naval Mine Warfare Centre of Excellence (EGUERMIN) COE in Ostend, Belgium
The Centre of Excellence for Operations in Confined and Shallow Waters in Kiel, Germany (supported by the German Navy's Einsatzflottille 1.)
The Strategic Communications Centre of Excellence (STRATCOM) COE in Riga, Latvia
The Crisis Management for Disaster Response  (CMDR) COE in Sofia, Bulgaria
The NATO Military Police   (MP) COE in Bydgoszcz, Poland
NATO Mountain Warfare Centre of Excellence in Poljče, Slovenia
NATO Stability Policing Centre of Excellence in Vicenza, Italy
NATO Counter Intelligence Centre of Excellence in Krakow, Poland / Slovakia
 NATO Security Force Assistance (SFA) Centre of Excellence in Rome, Italy
 The Integrated Air & Missile Defence Centre of Excellence (IAMD COE) in Crete, Greece
 The Maritime, Geospatial, Meteorological, & Oceanographic Centre of Excellence (MGEOMETOC COE) in Lisbon, Portugal
 The Maritime Security Centre of Excellence (MARSEC COE) in Istanbul, Turkey
The Centre of Excellence for naval Visit, Board, Search and Seizure, NATO Maritime Interdiction Operational Training Centre (NMIOTC) [http://nmiotc.nato.int/ , Souda Bay, Crete; supported by the Hellenic Navy.

Leadership

Supreme Allied Commander Transformation

Deputy Supreme Allied Commander Transformation

References

External links

ACT Official Website
NATO A to Z Centre of Excellence
ACT NATO Centres Of Excellence
Distributed Networked Battle Labs

 
Military units and formations in Virginia
Military units and formations established in 2003
2003 establishments in the United States
United States and NATO